Baidu Entertainment Hot Point is an award ceremony founded by Chinese web services company Baidu to honor most popular celebrities, televisions, films, and other internet contents. The Baidu Entertainment Hot Point has been held annually since 2008, and cooperated with one of the Chinese most influential Television network Hunan Television to broadcast on television for the first four years. In the fifth year, Baidu started to release the award information on its own website each year.

Winners

2008

2009

References 

Entertainment in China
Chinese awards
Chinese music awards